Talents and Admirers is a 1973 Soviet drama film directed by Isidor Annensky.

Plot 
The film tells the dramatic story of an actress who has to make a difficult choice.

Cast 
 Svetlana Pelikhovskaya as Aleksandra Nikolayevna Negina
 Olga Khorkova as Domna Panteleyevna
 Leonid Gubanov as Ivan Semyonych Velikatov
 Nikolai Gritsenko as Irakliy Stratonych Dulebov
 Aleksandr Belyavskiy as Grigoriy Antonych Bakin
 Nonna Terentyeva as Nina Vasilyevna Smelskaya
 Vladimir Bogin as Pyotr Yegorych Meluzov
 Yevgeny Lebedev as Martyn Prokofyich Narokov (as Yevgeni Lebedev)
 Rudolf Pankov as Vasya
 Grigori Abrikosov as Yerast Gromilov

References

External links 
 

1973 films
1970s Russian-language films
Soviet drama films
1973 drama films
Films scored by Tikhon Khrennikov